Kensington Gore is the name of a U-shaped thoroughfare on the south side of Hyde Park in the City of Westminster, England. The streets connect the Royal Albert Hall with the Royal College of Art, the Royal Geographical Society, and in Kensington Gardens the Albert Memorial. The area is named after the Gore estate which occupied the site until it was developed by Victorian planners in the mid 19th century.  A gore is a narrow, triangular piece of land.
 The street replaces part of Kensington Road, connecting what would otherwise be two separate streets.

History 
Gore House was the residence of political reformer William Wilberforce between 1808 and 1821. The three-acre (12,000 m2) estate was subsequently occupied by the Countess of Blessington and the Count D'Orsay from 1836 to 1849. 

In May 1851, the house opened as a restaurant by the chef Alexis Soyer, who planned to cater for the 1851 Great Exhibition in Hyde Park. After the exhibition and on the advice of Prince Albert, Gore House and its grounds were bought by the Exhibition's Royal Commission to create the cultural quarter known as Albertopolis. In 1871, the Royal Albert Hall was completed on the site of the former house. It was opened by Queen Victoria.

In 1892, The Gore Hotel was opened by sisters Miss Ada and Ms Cooke, descendants of Captain James Cook. The 50-bedroom luxury hotel has featured in many music videos and photo shoots, such as for Beggars Banquet by The Rolling Stones.

The streets are bounded to the north by Kensington Road (the A315). The nearest tube station is South Kensington to the south.

References

External links 
 LondonTown.com information
 Kensington Turnpike Trust Drawings — Kensington Gore

Streets in the City of Westminster